Dowyran (also Romanized as Dowyrān; also known as Doyrān) is a village in Nazlu-e Shomali Rural District, Nazlu District, Urmia County, West Azerbaijan Province, Iran. At the 2006 census, its population was 348, in 92 families.

References 

Populated places in Urmia County